Dmytro Boiko (born 16 January 1986) is a Ukrainian sabre fencer.

Boiko won the silver medal in the sabre team event at the 2006 World Fencing Championships after losing to France in the final. He accomplished this with his teammates Volodymyr Lukashenko, Oleh Shturbabin and Vladislav Tretiak.

Boiko was educated at the Lviv State University of Physical Culture. He married fellow sabre fencer Olha Kharlan in August 2014.

Achievements
 2006 World Fencing Championships, team sabre

References

1986 births
Living people
Ukrainian male sabre fencers
Olympic fencers of Ukraine
Fencers at the 2012 Summer Olympics
Universiade medalists in fencing
People from Netishyn
Universiade gold medalists for Ukraine
Medalists at the 2011 Summer Universiade
Sportspeople from Khmelnytskyi Oblast
21st-century Ukrainian people